António das Chagas, O.F.M. (Anthony of the Holy Wounds), (25 June 1631 – 20 October 1682) was a Portuguese Franciscan friar and ascetical writer.

Life

Early life
He was born António da Fonseca Soares on 25 June 1631 at Vidigueira, then in the ancient Province of Estremadura of the Kingdom of Portugal. He was the son of a Portuguese minor nobleman and judge and an Irish mother. He was enrolled at the Jesuit college in Évora for his primary studies. Later he was forced to leave his studies at the age of 18, due to the death of his father.

Upon the outbreak of the Portuguese Restoration War in 1640, Soares entered the Portuguese army as a common soldier. After the war, he fell into a life of idleness and gambling. In 1653 he was forced to flee to Bahia in the Portuguese colony of Brazil as the result of a duel. There he continued to lead a dissolute life, but was converted through the writings of the Dominican friar, Louis of Granada and promised God that he would change his ways.

Friar Minor
When Soares returned to Portugal in 1656, he returned to his former life of dissipation, until, in 1662, he was taken with a grievous illness. Upon his recovery he hastened to fulfill his promise, and was admitted into the Franciscan Order in May of the same year, receiving the religious name by which he is now known. He entered the branch of the Friars Minor which led a strict life of penance and asceticism, following the principles for the reform of the Order led by Peter of Alcantara.

António das Chagas then dedicated his life to one of preaching the Catholic faith throughout the countryside of southern Portugal. Determined to lead his audiences to a more spiritual life than he had lived, his preaching was known for a level of theatricality and extreme fervor which led to criticism of him by some of his contemporaries, such as noted Jesuit preacher, António Vieira.

In 1680 António received an Apostolic Brief from Pope Innocent XI which separated him from obedience to the Franciscan Province of Algarve. He then went to the Varatojo friary, in Torres Vedras, near Lisbon, where he dedicated himself to teaching friars preparing to serve as missionaries.

António died there on 20 October 1682 in leaving a great part of his writings still unpublished. His remains are preserved in a tomb in the chapter room of the friary.

Works
António became famous posthumously after the publication of his poetical and ascetic writings, in which he combined erudition with elegance of style.

The following were published posthumously:
"Faíscas de amor divino e lágrimas da alma" (Lisbon, 1683);
"Obras espirituais" (Lisbon, 1684–1687);
"O Padre nosso comentado" (Lisbon, 1688);
"Espelho do Espírito em que deve ver-se e compor-se a Alma" etc. (Lisbon, 1683);
"Escola da penitência e flagelo dos pecadores" (Lisbon, 1687);
"Sermões Genuínos" etc. (Lisbon, 1690);
"Cartas espirituais" (Lisbon, 1684);
"Ramalhete espiritual" etc. (Lisbon, 1722).

References
Godinho, Vida do F. Antonio da Fonseca Soares (Lisbon, 1687 and 1728);
De Soledad, Historia serafica da provincia de Portugal, III, 3, 17.

1631 births
1682 deaths
People from Vidigueira
Portuguese soldiers
Portuguese Friars Minor
Portuguese male writers
17th-century Portuguese Roman Catholic priests
Franciscan scholars
17th-century Portuguese writers
Burials in the Lisbon District
Portuguese people of Irish descent